Yanaqucha (Quechua yana "black, very dark", qucha "lake", "black lake", Hispanicized spelling Yanacocha) is a lake in the Cordillera Blanca in the Andes of  Peru located in the Ancash Region, Huari Province, Chavín de Huantar District. Yanaqucha lies in the Chacpar gorge north-west of Chavín de Huantar belonging to the Huascarán National Park. It supplies the local people with drinking water.

The lake is surrounded by plants like ichhu (Stipa ichu), lliqllish qura (Werneria nubigena), warwash hembra (Gynoxis sp.), ankush (Senecio canescens) and champa estrella (Plantago rigida). There is also trout in the lake. This is a place to watch birds like the yellow-billed teal, the blue-winged teal, the Andean gull and the Andean goose.

References 

Lakes of Peru
Lakes of Ancash Region